Bernard Benton (born January 6, 1957) is a retired American professional boxer in the Cruiserweight division who held the WBC and The Ring cruiserweight titles.

Professional career

Known as "The Bull", Benton turned pro in 1981 and won the WBC and lineal cruiserweight titles with a decision win over Alfonso Ratliff in 1985. He was due to defend against David Pearce who had knocked him out in a previous amateur bout. Benton declined to fight Pearce and subsequently lost the belt in his first defense to Carlos De León via decision the following year. He retired in 1995.

Professional boxing record

See also
List of world cruiserweight boxing champions

References

External links

Bernard "Bull" Benton - CBZ Profile

1957 births
Living people
American male boxers
African-American boxers
Boxers from Ohio
Sportspeople from Toledo, Ohio
Cruiserweight boxers
Heavyweight boxers
World cruiserweight boxing champions
World Boxing Council champions
The Ring (magazine) champions
21st-century African-American people
20th-century African-American sportspeople